Great Harwood is a town in Hyndburn, Lancashire, England.  It contains 16 buildings that are recorded in the National Heritage List for England as designated listed buildings.  Of these, one is listed at Grade I, the highest grade, four are at Grade II*, the middle grade, and the others are at Grade II.  The major building in the town is the former manor house, Martholme: this and two associated structures are listed.  The other listed buildings include churches and associated structures, farmhouses, large houses, a railway viaduct, a town hall, a bank, a public house, a clock tower, a war memorial, and a telephone kiosk.

Key

Buildings

References

Citations

Sources

Great Harwood
Lists of listed buildings in Lancashire
Buildings and structures in Hyndburn